There were more than a thousand British narrow-gauge railways ranging from large, historically significant common carriers to small, short-lived industrial railways. Many notable events in British railway history happened on narrow-gauge railways including the first use of steam locomotives, the first public railway and the first preserved railway.

History

Early railways: before 1865 

The earliest narrow-gauge railways were crude wooden trackways used in coal mines to guide wooden tubs. Because of the restricted loading gauge of the tunnels and the need for the tubs to be small enough to be pushed by one man, these railways were almost all narrow gauge. These underground lines often had short above-ground sections as well.

After the start of the Industrial Revolution it became possible to create railways with iron tracks and wheels, which reduced the friction involved in moving wagons and made longer horse-hauled trains possible. These could move more material over longer distances, allowing the construction of railways from mines and quarries to transshipment points on rivers, canals and the coast. The earliest narrow-gauge railways that were more than internal mine or quarry systems were all horse-drawn industrial railways. Prominent examples include: the  gauge Little Eaton Gangway of 1793; the  gauge Lake Lock Rail Road of 1796; the  gauge Penrhyn Railroad of 1801; and the  gauge Surrey Iron Railway of 1803. The Lake Lock Rail Road is recognized as the world's first public railway.

Meanwhile, the development of the stationary steam engine was proceeding to the point where early steam locomotives were being proposed. In 1804, Richard Trevithick demonstrated the first locomotive-hauled railway in the world: the  gauge Penydarren Tramway in south Wales. Although this first use of locomotives was a limited and short-lived experiment, in 1812, the  gauge Middleton Railway in Leeds became the first in the world to make commercial use of steam locomotives.

Steam technology developed rapidly in the early 19th century, allowing smaller locomotives to haul more goods. The horse-drawn Ffestiniog Railway opened in 1836 to connect the slate quarries at Blaenau Ffestiniog with the coastal port of Porthmadog. The traffic on the line quickly grew to the point where the horses could no longer haul the empty slate wagons back to the quarries quickly enough to meet demand. In 1863, steam locomotives were introduced on the  gauge railway, with passenger services following in 1865. This was the first steam operated railway providing both freight and passenger services on such a small gauge and it proved the model for the introduction of narrow-gauge railways across the world.

In 1846, the British Parliament passed the Gauges Act that established  as the standard gauge for Britain. After the Gauges Act, most of the railway track laid in Great Britain was to standard gauge. However many minor railways, both public and industrial, were built to narrower gauges. These lines either followed local traditions or were built in locations where the smaller size of the railway proved more economical.

The boom years: 1865–1914 

The success of the Ffestiniog Railway triggered a boom in the construction of narrow-gauge railways, not just in Britain but around the world. In the United Kingdom, the centre of narrow gauge construction was North Wales. The mountains of the north held large quantities of slate and their narrow valleys and steep hillsides meant that the smaller narrow-gauge railways were cost effective. The major slate mining regions at Bethesda, Llanberis, Blaenau Ffestiniog and Corris all developed multiple railways to serve the quarries. Some of these lines, like the Ffestiniog Railway, the Corris Railway and the Talyllyn Railway were common carriers, while others like the Penrhyn Quarry Railway and the Padarn Railway were industrial lines.

Outside Wales, other industries started to use narrow-gauge railways to move freight, notably ironstone, limestone, china clay, brick clay and metals. Many common carrier lines were built: most of the railways on the Isle of Man were narrow gauge – mostly  gauge. A number of railways were built to connect standard gauge railways with smaller towns, including the Southwold Railway, the Wolverton and Stony Stratford Tramway and the famous Lynton and Barnstaple Railway in Devon. These lines allowed communities that did not merit a full railway service to connect to the mainline network at low cost.

The 1880s were the high point of British narrow-gauge railways as traffic on many of these lines reached its peak volume and new lines were built across the country.

In 1896, the Light Railways Act was passed which allowed the construction of railways to less stringent standards than had previously been allowed. This led to a short resurgence in the building of narrow-gauge railways, especially in rural locations. In Wales, the Welshpool and Llanfair Light Railway was built to serve farming communities and the Vale of Rheidol Light Railway was a tourist line that also served lead mines; in England the Leek and Manifold Valley Light Railway served similar purposes in the Staffordshire Moorlands.

The 1904 Railway Clearing House Railway Atlas showed the major narrow gauge railways:

Decline of the narrow gauge: 1914–1950 

After the First World War, rail traffic declined with the widespread adoption of motor vehicles and public narrow gauge lines in Britain began to struggle financially. Most of these railways were built to serve marginal traffic that would not support a larger line. As road competition increased, many existing lines fell into decline and fewer new railways were built.

The 1920s saw a brief resurgence of the narrow gauge as surplus equipment from the War Department Light Railways (WDLR) became available. Several industrial railways were built using second-hand WDLR equipment, notably the Leighton Buzzard Light Railway. Other lines such as the Glyn Valley Tramway and the Snailbeach District Railways were able to replace ageing locomotives relatively cheaply and continue to operate on shoestring budgets. Even the famed Ffestiniog Railway acquired a Baldwin locomotive to shore up the fleet working the Welsh Highland Railway which it now owned.

The last narrow-gauge commercial carrier in Britain was the Ashover Light Railway, opened in 1925 using surplus war equipment. This was the epitome of cheaply constructed light railways and was one of several minor railways owned by Colonel Stephens.

Meanwhile, the use of narrow-gauge railways in industry continued to flourish. Many small railways were built to serve sand and gravel pits, cement works and the peat and timber extraction industries, often using ex-WDLR equipment.

The continued development of road transport and the economic crises of the 1930s saw a slow decline in the use of narrow-gauge railways across the country. The Second World War pushed many struggling enterprises into bankruptcy as labour and materials were diverted to the war effort. During and immediately after the war, the majority of the remaining lines closed: between 1946 and 1950 the Ffestiniog, Corris, Ashover Light, Rye and Camber and Eaton Hall railways all closed. Many industrial lines did not survive the war years.

The narrow gauge after 1950 

The use of narrow-gauge railways in Britain declined throughout the first half of the 20th century. This decline accelerated after the Second World War as improved road transport displaced railways in industry and for passenger service.

In 1951 however, a group of railway enthusiasts, alarmed at the loss of this part of British industrial heritage, stepped in to save the failing Talyllyn Railway. This became the first railway to be run entirely by volunteers and sparked a movement to preserve many railways, both narrow and standard gauge as tourist attractions. Since then many lines have been preserved as working museums, and new narrow-gauge railways are being constructed for the tourist industry.

In the 21st century a very few industrial and common carrier lines survive. Notable among the latter are the Glasgow Subway, an underground metro line that operates on a  gauge, and the Manx Electric Railway on the Isle of Man.

Significant lines 
Amongst the most well-known narrow-gauge lines in Britain are the Ffestiniog, the oldest independent railway company in the world, the Talyllyn, the world's first preserved railway of any gauge, and the Welshpool & Llanfair in Wales; and the Lynton & Barnstaple in England. Unique among British railways is the rack-and-pinion Snowdon Mountain Railway which climbs to just below the summit of Wales' highest peak.

Several significant lines operate on the Isle of Man. The  gauge Isle of Man Steam Railway operates as a tourist attraction. The  Manx Electric Railway has the two oldest operating electric trams in the world. The  gauge Snaefell Mountain Railway climbs the island's main peak and is the sole operating Fell system railway in the world.

The narrow-gauge railways of Britain and the Isle of Man

Public railways 
These are narrow-gauge railways that ran public passenger trains for a significant portion of their existence. In 1951 the Talyllyn Railway was the first railway in the world to be taken over and preserved by volunteers. This was the birth of the heritage railway movement, which has flourished in Britain and around the world in the years since. As a result, many of these lines passed from being common carriers and were preserved as heritage railways after their demise. Where this has happened their heritage existence is included as a second row.

Estate railways 
Narrow-gauge railways serving private estates. These were often minimum-gauge railways.

Museums 
Museums devoted to narrow-gauge railways

Visitor attractions 
Narrow-gauge railways that operate as part of a larger tourist attraction, such as an estate or theme park.

Private railways 

These are private lines or collections owned by individuals or small groups and generally not open to the public.

Industrial railways 

Great Britain was home to many industrial narrow-gauge railways, ranging from temporary hand-powered lines a few yards long to significant locomotive-worked complexes of lines that served substantial industrial concerns.

Military railways 

Many British military establishments and former UK Government-owned explosives sites used narrow-gauge railways. These locations were often subject to the Official Secrets Act and other government restrictions, so many of them are less well documented.

See also 

 British quarrying and mining narrow-gauge railways
 British narrow-gauge slate railways
 Decauville
 Industrial railways
 List of British heritage and private railways

Notes

References 

 
 
 
 
 
 
 

 
British, narrow